Lucas is the second album by Ghostly International artist Skeletons and the first under their new name of Skeletons and the Kings of All Cities. It was released in 2007.

Background 
The album was named after Lucas, Kansas. A common theme on the album is hair.

The band's sound on the album has been compared to Animal Collective, Gang Gang Dance, Excepter, Tortoise, the Sea and Cake, and Sufjan Stevens' the Age of Adz.

Track listing 
All tracks composed by Matthew Mehlan
"What They Said" – 5:02
"Fake Tits" – 3:34
"Hay W'happns?" – 5:17
"Don't Worry" – 10:50
"The Shit From the Dogs" – 3:13
"Like It Or Not" – 3:40
"Let It Out" – 2:55
"Sickness" – 4:45
"Push 'im Out" – 19:37
Contains about seven minutes of silence

Personnel

Performers 
 Mikey Ames (drums)
Erik Carlson (violin)
Peter Evans (trumpet)
Glenda Goodman (viola)
 Carsion Halegar (bass)
 Jeremy Keller (guitar)
Sam Kulik (trumpet)
 Jon Leland (percussion)
 Jason McMahon (guitar)
 Matthew Mehlan (vocals, guitar, electronics)
 Cyrus Pireh (alto saxophone)

Art 
 Justin Craun

References

2007 albums
Skeletons (band) albums
Ghostly International albums
Synth-pop albums by American artists
Experimental pop albums